The 2018 Rugby World Cup Sevens was the seventh edition of the Rugby World Cup Sevens. Organised by World Rugby, it was held at AT&T Park, now known as Oracle Park, in San Francisco, United States. A total of 84 matches were played over three days from July 20–22, 2018. The men’s tournament had 24 teams and the women’s tournament 16, with both tournaments being played for the first time in a knock-out only format. 
New Zealand won the championship for both events — defeating England in the men's final and France in the women's final.

Bidding
The bidding timeline for hosting the tournament was as follows:
 February 28, 2014 —Interested countries declare their "intent to tender"
 August 29, 2014 — World Rugby (then the IRB) distributes the tender documentation
 December 5, 2014 — Countries submit their bids to World Rugby
 May 13, 2015 — World Rugby Council chooses the host country

The following 14 countries declared their interest in bidding to host the event:
 
  England
  Fiji
  France
  Hong Kong
  Netherlands
  New Zealand
  Portugal
  Scotland
  Singapore
  South Africa
  Spain
  United Arab Emirates
  United States

Venue
USA Rugby selected the San Francisco Bay Area as the host candidate. The venue was AT&T Park, home to the San Francisco Giants of Major League Baseball.

When the event was awarded to the Bay Area in May 2015, Avaya Stadium, home to the San Jose Earthquakes of Major League Soccer, was announced as a second venue. However, the following year, Avaya Stadium was dropped as a venue.

Popularity
The three-day tournament was the most-watched live rugby cast in the USA on record. In the U.S. Day 2 coverage achieved a rating of 1.0, while Day 3 coverage attained a 1.1. Coverage reached nine million viewers across NBC five telecasts, with finals day coverage averaging 1.365 million viewers. Over 100,000 fans attended the three day event, which was a record-breaking crowd for a rugby event in the United States.

Schedule
Over the three days of competition there was a total of 84 matches played across both the men's and women's competitions.

All times in Pacific Daylight Time (UTC−07:00).

Qualifying – Men 

Twenty four teams participate in the men's World Cup Sevens. Nine teams automatically qualify — eight by reaching the quarterfinals at the 2013 Rugby World Cup Sevens, and one host nation. Additionally, the top four teams not already qualified from the 2016–17 World Sevens Series also qualify. The remaining 11 teams qualify through continental qualifiers — two from each of the six regions, except North America which gets only one additional place.

Qualifying – Women 

Sixteen teams play at the women's World Cup Sevens. Four teams automatically qualified by reaching the semifinals at the 2013 Rugby World Cup Sevens. Additionally, the top four teams not already qualified from the 2016–17 Women's World Sevens Series also qualified. The remaining eight places will be filled via continental qualifiers.

Tournament – Men

Tournament – Women

See also

 Sports in the San Francisco Bay Area
 Rugby union in the United States

References

 
2018
2018 rugby sevens competitions
2018 in American rugby union
International rugby union competitions hosted by the United States
Rugby sevens competitions in the United States
Rugby World Cup Sevens
Rugby union in California
Sports competitions in San Francisco
July 2018 sports events in the United States